Desiree Carofiglio (born 11 March 2000) is an Italian artistic gymnast. She was part of the Italian team that won bronze at the 2019 World Championships.

Personal life 
Carofiglio was born in Casarile on 11 March 2000.

Gymnastics career

Junior

2014–15 
Carofiglio made her international debut at the 2014 City of Jesolo Trophy where she placed sixteenth in the all-around, eighth on vault, and sixth on balance beam.  She later competed at a friendly competition in Munich where she placed thirteenth.  In May she competed at the European Championships where she helped Italy place fifth in the team final and individually she placed seventh in the vault final.  She later competed at the Italy National Championships where she placed seventeenth in the all-around and fifth on vault.  In September Carofiglio competed at the Golden League  where she won bronze on vault.

In 2015 Carofiglio competed at the Golden League, winning bronze in the team final and placing tenth in the all-around.  At the Italian National Championships she placed eleventh in the all-around, third on vault, and seventh on balance beam.

Senior

2016 
Carofiglio turned senior in 2016.  She competed at the 1st Italian Serie A where she placed third in the all-around behind Giorgia Villa and Carlotta Ferlito and fourth in the team competition.  She made her international senior debut at the 2016 City of Jesolo Trophy where she helped Italy finish third and individually she placed 22nd in the all-around, fifth on vault, and eighth on floor exercise.

2017 
Carofiglio competed at the first Italian Serie A where her club placed third and individually she placed fourth in the all-around. She next competed at the 2017 City of Jesolo Trophy where she placed 21st in the all-around, fourth on vault, and fifth in the team final.  At the second Italian Serie A she placed third in the all-around behind Martina Maggio and Asia D'Amato.  Carofiglio competed at the Italian Gold Championships in May where she won silver in the all-around and on vault behind Maggio, fifth on uneven bars and balance beam, and won gold on floor exercise.  In June she competed at the FIT Challenge where she placed 12th in the all-around and helped Italy win gold.  At the Italian National Championships Carofiglio placed sixth in the all-around, second on vault behind D'Amato, and fourth on floor exercise.  In October Carofiglio competed at the 2017 World Championships but did not qualify for any event finals.

2018 
Carofiglio competed at the first Italian Serie A where she placed fourth in the all-around behind Giorgia Villa, Asia D'Amato, and Alice D'Amato.  In April she competed at the City of Jesolo Trophy where she helped Italy win bronze and individually she placed fifteenth in the all-around, sixth on vault, and won bronze on floor exercise, tied with Grace McCallum.  In June Carofiglio had surgery on her knee and was out for the remainder of the season.

2019 
Carofiglio competed at the 2019 City of Jesolo Trophy where she helped Italy place third and individually she placed tenth in the all-around, second on vault, and fifth on floor exercise.  She later competed at a friendly competition in Heerenveen where she helped Italy place first and individually she placed sixth in the all-around.  At the Italian National Championships Carofiglio placed second in the all-around behind Asia D'Amato, fourth on vault, uneven bars, and balance beam, and won gold on floor exercise.

On September 4 Carofiglio was named to the team to compete at the 2019 World Championships in Stuttgart, Germany alongside D'Amato, Alice D'Amato, Giorgia Villa, and Elisa Iorio.

During qualifications at the World Championships Carofiglio helped Italy qualify to the team final in eighth place; as a result Italy also qualified to the 2020 Olympic Games in Tokyo. In the team final, Carofiglio helped Italy win the bronze medal – Italy's first team medal since the 1950 World Artistic Gymnastics Championships.  They ended up finishing behind the United States and Russia but ahead of China, who originally qualified to the final in second place.

2020 
Carofiglio was selected to represent Italy at the Birmingham World Cup taking place in March.  However the Birmingham World Cup was later canceled due to the COVID-19 pandemic in the United Kingdom.  In October Carofiglio injured her Achilles tendon.

2021 
Carofiglio returned to competition at the 2021 Italian national championships where she only competed on balance beam and uneven bars.  Although she was not sufficiently recovered enough to be selected to represent Italy at the Olympic Games, she was selected to compete at the 2021 World Championships.

Competitive history

References 

Italian female artistic gymnasts
2000 births
Living people
Medalists at the World Artistic Gymnastics Championships
People from Lodi, Lombardy
Sportspeople from the Province of Lodi